28 athletes represented Hong Kong Special Administrative Region at the 2000 Summer Paralympics.

Medal table

See also
Hong Kong at the 2000 Summer Olympics
Hong Kong at the Paralympics

References

Bibliography

External links
International Paralympic Committee

Nations at the 2000 Summer Paralympics
Paralympics
2000